Lucy Temple is a novel by American author Susanna Rowson. It was first published posthumously (together with a memoir of the author by Samuel Lorenzo Knapp) in 1828 under the title Charlotte's Daughter, or, The Three Orphans. It was a sequel to Rowson's extremely popular novel Charlotte Temple. Lucy Temple is the daughter of Charlotte Temple, the main character in the first novel.

References

External links
 Full text of book online 

1828 British novels
1828 American novels
Novels by Susanna Rowson
Literary characters introduced in 1828
Female characters in literature